The Wind & Wuthering Tour was an English, North American, South American and European concert tour by the English rock band Genesis.

Their last tour with guitarist Steve Hackett prior to his departure, and the first with Chester Thompson as their touring drummer, the tour was staged in support of their 1976 album Wind & Wuthering and their 1977 extended play Spot the Pigeon, visiting theatres and arenas from January to July 1977. The band used improved sound and stage lighting systems than before, including a set of Boeing aircraft landing lights. The tour featured Genesis' first South American dates, playing eight shows in three Brazilian cities, drawing large crowds and an enthusiastic response from fans and the press. Recordings from the tour's dates in Paris were used for the band's second live album Seconds Out, released in 1977.

Set list 
A typical set list included:

Setlist from 1 January 1977 – 8 January 1977
 "Eleventh Earl of Mar"
 "The Carpet Crawlers"
 "Firth of Fifth"
 "Your Own Special Way"
 "Robbery, Assault and Battery"
 "... In That Quiet Earth"
 "Afterglow"
 Medley: (first night only)
 "Liliywhite Lilith"
 "The Waiting Room"
 "Wot Gorilla?"
 "One for the Vine" 
 "Squonk"
 "All in a Mouse's Night"
 "Supper's Ready"
 "I Know What I Like (In Your Wardrobe)" 
 "Dance on a Volcano" 
 Drum Duet / "Los Endos"
 "The Lamb Lies Down on Broadway" / "The Musical Box" (closing section)

Setlist from 9 January 1977 onwards
 "Squonk"
 "One for the Vine"
 "Robbery, Assault and Battery"
 "Your Own Special Way" (dropped after 3 April 1977)
 "Inside and Out" (after 3 April 1977)
 "Firth of Fifth"
 "The Carpet Crawlers"
 "...In That Quiet Earth"
 "Afterglow"
 "I Know What I Like (In Your Wardrobe)"
 "Eleventh Earl of Mar"
 "All In A Mouse's Night" (dropped after 23 January 1977)
 "Supper's Ready"
 "Dance on a Volcano"
  Drum Duet /" Los Endos"
 "The Lamb Lies Down on Broadway" / "The Musical Box" (closing section)
 "The Knife" (performed on 18–22 May in São Paulo and 23–25 June in London)

Setlist changes:

1/09/77: "The Carpet Crawlers" and "All In A Mouse's Night" are omitted, "Firth of Fifth" is played after "Eleventh Earl of Mar".

1/11/77: "Firth of Fifth" is played after "All In A Mouse's Night", "The Carpet Crawlers" is played after "Eleventh Earl of Mar".

1/13/77: Same changes as 1/11/77.

1/14/77: "The Carpet Crawlers" and "All In A Mouse's Night" are omitted.

1/19/77: "...In That Quiet Earth" is played after "Firth of Fifth".

1/21/77: "Your Own Special Way" is omitted, "All In A Mouse's Night" is played after "The Carpet Crawlers", "The Carpet Crawlers" is played after "Eleventh Earl of Mar".

Tour dates

Box office score data

Tour band 
 Phil Collins – lead vocals, percussion, drums
 Tony Banks – Hammond T-102 organ, Mellotron M-400, RMI 368x Electra Piano and Harpsichord; ARP Pro Soloist and ARP 2600 synthesizers, 12-string guitar, backing vocals
 Steve Hackett – electric guitar, 12-string guitar
 Mike Rutherford – bass, Moog Taurus bass pedals, 12-string & electric guitars, backing vocals
 Chester Thompson – drums, percussion

References 

Genesis (band) concert tours
1977 concert tours